Emotion Media Factory GmbH (EMF) is a creative multimedia attraction and show production company based near Munich in front of the Bavarian Alps in Germany. Emotion Media Factory produces multimedia fountains and attractions.

Emotion Media Factory is a member of IAAPA and TEA organisations.

History 
Originally Emotion Media Factory was established in 1984 as Laserland. The original founders where Ralph Douw, Helmut Dörner, Robert Huber and Serge Douw. Among the first clients of the company were BMW, Siemens, Pepsi-Cola and Audi.

Awards 
Emotion Media Factory has received award “The Best Building and Construction” of the year 2012 for their project of Multimedia Fountain Roshen

In October 2015 multimedia show for Romon U-Park  “Zheng He is coming” by Emotion Media Factory becomes a finalist of the Brass Rings Awards by IAAPA.

Each year between 2014 and 2017 Emotion Media Factory has been awarded with TripAdvisor’s Certificate of Excellence for Multimedia Fountain Roshen.

Multimedia shows 

Inventions Show, Multimedia Fountain Roshen, Vinnitsya, Ukraine
The idea for the Inventions show was inspired by the major milestones of human inventions. Mechanical, Electrical, Analogue and then finally Digital. The concept idea was to create a multimedia show with very many different elements of media combinations. For each era of time a different approach and visual look was chosen. The music was individually composed and produced for each scene together with Alexius Tschallener (Music4Films).

Swan Lake Fantasy Show, Multimedia Fountain Roshen, Vinnitsya, Ukraine
Swan Lake Fantasy Show is a co-production between Emotion Media Factory and the Ukrainian company Watershow.Pro. The theme is a total re-interpretation of Tchaikovsky’s Swan Lake. Ukrainian top ballet dancers’ performance is combined with multimedia effects in the new interpretation of the classical ballet.

Zheng He is coming, Romon U-Park, Ningbo, China 
“Zheng He is coming”, is multimedia spectacle that tells the tale of Zheng He, a Chinese admiral and diplomat of the 15th century. Zheng He commanded massive expeditionary voyages to Southeast Asia, South Asia, the Middle East, and East Africa from 1405 to 1433. The show was a finalist of the Brass Rings Awards by IAAPA.

Multimedia fountains and installations 
Romon U-Park, Ningbo, China – EMF developed created and produced two 20 minute multimedia shows The shows are based on ten Barco video projectors projecting on to a 30x30 meter pyramid, the 20 meters wide pyramid stage screen and the back wall, 2x High-End video servers, 12x full colour laser projectors, 48 moving lights, 20x flame bursts and 18 meters digital water screen all centrally controlled and synchronized.

Multimedia Fountain Roshen, Vinnitsya, Ukraine – completed in 2011, it is Europe's largest floating fountain system and was created by EMF in the Ukrainian city of Vinnytsia for the Roshen Confectionery Group.

High One, Gangwon, South Korea – EMF has worked with the Kangwon Land Resort (now known as High One). In 2007, there was a full multimedia upgrade of the facilities, which added 2 circular fountains features, both 30-metre in diameter, a 40-metre water screen, multicolour fire effects, high definition video projection, and laser beams. This fountain is one of the largest in Asia.
Night Safari Park, Chiang Mai, Thailand – the Night Safari Park multimedia fountain show consists of the 30 x 6 m large floating multimedia fountain construction and water screen with laser graphics. The fountain is equipped with more than 1,200 water jets to create a variety of water effects in time to music. In addition, a water screen is built into the feature, providing a 40-metre wide and 15-metre high projection area for video, light and laser projections. The project was completed for the opening show in 2006, marking the 60th anniversary of the king's coronation.

3D HoloPort 

The HoloPort is an attraction where spectators do not need 3D glasses to see realistic 3D images. Examples of installations include:

The Magic House, Phoenix Market City, Chennai, India – a ten-minute long 3D show titled A Journey to Paradise in iPlay India's family entertainment zone. Opened in 2013.
Europa-Park, Rust, Germany – a  theater installation is based in Enchanted Forest area in the Grimm Library. Up to 40 visitors at a time can watch a short drama about the Grimms in 3D. EMF's brief was to use the HoloPort for production of a virtual 3D world with high-resolution character animation and 3D still images to project also parts of the interior. A further highlight in the theatre is the live integration of visitors in the show. Some selected persons can see themselves as Giant, a King, or a witch in the movie.

AIDA Cruises 
Cruise ships operated by Aida Cruises have EMF-supplied laser technology, which can withstand extreme climatic conditions as well as direct contact with sea water on the open-air deck. The multimedia shows are developed, programmed and implemented on a remote basis. For all cruise liners new shows are created about 3 – 4 times per year. Totally over 40 shows are produced each year for AIDA Cruises.

References 

Entertainment companies of Germany
Companies based in Munich
Entertainment companies established in 1984
Privately held companies of Germany